Sir Stuart Coldwell Goodwin (19 April 1886 – 6 June 1969) was a Sheffield steel industrialist and philanthropist who gave away over £500,000 to charities, particularly in south Yorkshire and north Nottinghamshire.

He was head of the Neepsend Steel and Tool Corporation. He was knighted in the 1953 Coronation Honours list and was High Sheriff of Nottinghamshire in 1955.

Soon after the end of WW2 he launched a  notable and pioneering personal initiative.  British industries needed to rebuild – and learn from otther countries.  He decided to provide funding for Travelling Fellowships specifically for young graduate engineers.  Two “Sir Stuart Goodwin Fellowships”  were awarded in each year between 1949 and 1958, all to recent graduates of Christ’s College and St John’s College Cambridge.  The Fellowship was administered on his behalf by an eminent committee led by the charismatic and influential  David Rennie Hardman, previously Secretary for Education in the British Government.

In 1962, he founded the Sir Stuart and Lady Florence Goodwin Charity. There is a sports centre in Sheffield named after him, as was the Goodwin Fountain on Fargate in the same city.

The Sir Stuart Goodwin room at Newark Showground is named after him. The Lady Goodwin Play Park in Farnsfield, Nottinghamshire, is named after Lady Florence.

In the 1950s he sponsored and financially supported a number of golf tournaments including the 1957 Ryder Cup and the 1960 Curtis Cup matches at Lindrick Golf Club. Goodwin was President of Lindrick from 1958 to 1960.

References

English philanthropists
People educated at King Edward VI Grammar School, Retford
Businesspeople from Sheffield
1886 births
1969 deaths
20th-century British philanthropists
Knights Bachelor
High Sheriffs of Nottinghamshire
20th-century English businesspeople